Entegris, Inc. is an American provider of products and systems that purify, protect, and transport critical materials used in the semiconductor device fabrication process.

Entegris operates out of its headquarters in Billerica, Massachusetts. The company has about 5,800 employees in manufacturing, service center, and research facilities in the United States, Canada, Malaysia, Singapore, Taiwan, China, Korea, Japan, Israel, Ireland, Germany, and France.

The company seeks to help manufacturers increase their yields by improving contamination control in several key processes, including photolithography, wet etch and clean, chemical-mechanical planarization, thin-film deposition, bulk chemical processing, wafer and reticle handling and shipping, and testing, assembly and packaging. Approximately 80% of the company's products are used in the semiconductor industry.

Products
Entegris products include: filtration products that purify process gases and fluids, as well as the ambient environment; liquid systems and components that dispense, control, or transport process fluids; high-performance materials and specialty gas management solutions; wafer carriers and shippers that protect the semiconductor wafer from contamination and breakage; and specialized graphite, silicon carbide, and coatings.

History
The company was incorporated in 1999 as the combined entity of Fluoroware, Inc., which began operating in 1966, and EMPAK, Inc. The company went public in 2000.

In August 2005, Entegris merged with Mykrolis Corporation, a publicly held supplier of filtration products to the semiconductor industry. Mykrolis was spun-out of Millipore Corporation in 2000.

In August 2008, Entegris acquired Poco Graphite, Inc., a Decatur, Texas supplier of specialized graphite and silicon carbide products for use in semiconductor, EDM, glass bottling, biomedical, aerospace, and alternative energy applications.

On April 30, 2014, Entegris acquired Danbury, Connecticut-based ATMI, a publicly held company providing critical materials and materials-handling solutions to the semiconductor industry, in a $1.1 billion transaction.

In Dec 2020, Entegris announced an investment of US$500 million, building a state-of-the-art facility in Taiwan. The project is expected to complete in three years in Kaohsiung Science Park.

In July 2022, Entegris acquired another US semiconductor chemicals company, CMC Materials Inc, for $5.7 billion. The acquisition, previously known as Cabot Microelectronics Corp, had 2,200 employees.

References

 Li1, S., Shih, S., Yen, S., Yang, J.: "Case Study of Microcontamination Control." Aerosol and Air Quality Research, Vol. 7, No. 3, pp. 432–442, 2007

Manufacturing companies based in Massachusetts
Manufacturing companies established in 1966
Equipment semiconductor companies
1966 establishments in Massachusetts
Companies listed on the Nasdaq
2000 initial public offerings
2005 mergers and acquisitions
1999 mergers and acquisitions